Michael Hayes is an American television drama series that aired on CBS from September 15, 1997 to June 15, 1998. It stars David Caruso and Ruben Santiago-Hudson.

Summary 
David Caruso plays in the title role, an Irish Catholic ex-New York City police officer appointed acting United States Attorney for the Southern District of New York.

This series was Caruso's first attempt at a comeback on television after he left NYPD Blue.

Cast 
 David Caruso as Michael Hayes
 Ruben Santiago-Hudson as Eddie Diaz
 Mary B. Ward as Caitlin Hayes
 Jimmy Galeota as Daniel Hayes Jr.
 David Cubitt as Danny Hayes
 Peter Outerbridge as John Manning
 Hillary Danner as Jenny Nevins
 Philip Baker Hall as William Vaughn
 Rebecca Rigg as Lindsay Straus

Episodes

References

External links 
 
 

1990s American crime drama television series
1990s American legal television series
1997 American television series debuts
1998 American television series endings
CBS original programming
English-language television shows
Fictional portrayals of the New York City Police Department
New York Supreme Court
Television series by Sony Pictures Television
Television shows set in New York City
Television series about prosecutors